Vespucci may refer to:

 Agostino Vespucci of Florence
 Amerigo Vespucci, Italian explorer, assistant  of Christopher Columbus and after whom the American continent was named.
Ponte Amerigo Vespucci, a bridge over the Arno River in Florence, Italy
 Italian training ship Amerigo Vespucci, a tall ship of the Italian Navy
 Simonetta Vespucci, Italian Renaissance noblewoman from Genoa
 Vespucci, a map editing program for OpenStreetMap